The Taiwan Independence Party (TAIP), also known as the Taiwan Nation Party, was a political party in Taiwan. It was usually associated with the Pan-Green Coalition and supported Taiwan independence.

History 
Disappointed by the Democratic Progressive Party's (DPP) gradual moderation of its support of Taiwan independence, some DPP members, many connected to Peng Ming-min's "Nation Building Association" formed the Taiwan Independence Party in 1996. However, the party has failed to win large-scale support, due to the lack of organizational skills and internal disagreements. It was largely displaced as Taiwan's ideological independence party by the Taiwan Solidarity Union (TSU). The Ministry of Interior removed its entry from the registry of parties on 29 April 2020.

Election results

Legislative elections

References 

 
Political parties established in 1996
Political parties in Taiwan
Left-wing nationalist parties
Anti-communist parties
Anti-imperialist organizations
Progressive parties in Taiwan
Far-left politics in Taiwan
Identity politics in Taiwan
Taiwan independence movement